This is a list of the National Register of Historic Places listings in Butler County, Pennsylvania.

This is intended to be a complete list of the properties and districts on the National Register of Historic Places in Butler County, Pennsylvania, United States.  The locations of National Register properties and districts for which the latitude and longitude coordinates are included below, may be seen in a map.

There are 13 properties and districts listed on the National Register in the county. One site is further designated as a National Historic Landmark District.

Current listings

|}

See also 

 List of Pennsylvania state historical markers in Butler County

References 

Butler County